Uugla is a village in Lääne-Nigula Parish, Lääne County, in western Estonia.

References

External links 
 Uugla complex of antiquites (10th–13th centuries)

Villages in Lääne County